Qala Wathiyani (Aymara qala stone, wathiya decoction of a dish on a stone oven, -ni a suffix to indicate ownership, also spelled Khala Bateani) is a  mountain in the Cordillera Real in the Bolivian Andes. It is located in the La Paz Department, Murillo Province, La Paz Municipality. Qala Wathiyani is situated northwest of the peak of Maman Quta.

References 

Mountains of La Paz Department (Bolivia)